Ivor Leslie Perry (born August 1904, date of death unknown) was a professional footballer who played in The Football League for Bristol Rovers.

Perry started his career with his home town club Ystrad Rovers, and after an unsuccessful trial with Tottenham Hotspur he joined Pontypridd. He joined Torquay United in August 1926, for whom he played a total of 55 games in the Southern League and Western League, scoring once in each league during the 1926–27 season. In the summer of 1927 he joined the only Football League club of his career in Bristol Rovers, where he played 35 times in Football League Division Three South in two years.

After leaving Bristol Rovers he had his second unsuccessful trial with a club, this time at Middlesbrough, and he later played for Walton-on-Thames, where he made his debut in a 7–0 win over Dorking in November 1932.

Sources

1904 births
Year of death missing
People from Ystrad
Sportspeople from Rhondda Cynon Taf
Welsh footballers
Association football midfielders
English Football League players
Southern Football League players
Torquay United F.C. players
Bristol Rovers F.C. players